Lynn Miles (born 29 September 1958) is a Canadian singer-songwriter. She has won the Juno Award and three Canadian Folk Music Awards.

Early life and education
Miles was born on 29 September 1958 in the town of Cowansville, Quebec. Her father was a harmonica player and jazz fan while her mother listened to both opera and country music. Miles learned to play the violin, guitar, piano and flute during her school years. She began composing songs at the age of ten and began performing at the age of sixteen. While in her twenties Miles studied voice with a private teacher and classical music history and theory at Carleton University in Ottawa.

Career
Miles became a voice teacher at the Ottawa Folklore Centre. Her first recording of original material was a nine-song demo which she created in 1987. In the early 1990s Miles released a self-titled album plus an additional recording called Chalk This One Up to the Moon. Her composition "Remembrance Day" became part of a nationally televised video created by the Canadian Armed Forces. Miles' 1996 album, Slightly Haunted received favorable reviews in the New York Times and was a Billboard Top Ten Pick of the Year. In 1997 she released the album Night in a Strange Town.

Miles reunited with collaborator and guitarist Ian LeFeuvre for her 2001 album, Unravel, which won the 2003 Juno award for Best Roots & Traditional Album of the Year: Solo. Miles was nominated in 2005 for a Canadian Folk Music Awards. In 2006 Miles recorded the album Love Sweet Love which was released in the U.S. on Red House Records.  It was recorded with guitarists Ian LeFeuvre and Keith Glass, drummer Peter Von Althen, John Geggie on bass, James Stephens on violin. It was nominated for a 2006 Juno Award. In 2009, the Art Of Time Ensemble featuring Sarah Slean recorded Miles' song, "Black Flowers."

Her 2010 album Fall for Beauty was nominated at the Juno Awards of 2011 in the Roots & Traditional Album of the year category. Miles has re-recorded acoustic versions of her songs in a series called Black Flowers. The first two volumes were produced in 2008 and 2009 on her Cold Girl record label and later re-released by True North Records in 2009. A third volume was released in August 2012. New York Times music critic, John Pareles wrote that Miles' music "makes forlorn feel like a state of grace." In 2014 she produced the Lynne Hanson album River of Sand.

She also collaborates with Hanson in the band project The Lynnes, who released their debut album Heartbreak Song for the Radio in 2018.

Personal life
Miles lived in Ottawa and Nashville, Tennessee before moving to Los Angeles in 1997. She moved to Austin, Texas before returning to her home country of Canada.

Discography
 Lynn Miles, (cassette demo) 1987
 Chalk This One Up to the Moon, 1991
 Slightly Haunted, 1996
 Night in a Strange Town, 1997
 Unravel, 2001
 Love Sweet Love, 2006
 Black Flowers, Volume 1, 2008
 Lynn Miles: Live at the Chapel, 2009
 Black Flowers, Volume 2, 2009
 Fall for Beauty, 2010
 Black Flowers, Volume 3, 2012
 Downpour, 2013
 Black Flowers, Volume 4, 2014
 Winter, 2015
 Road (with Keith Glass), 2016
 We'll Look for Stars, 2020
 TumbleWeedyWorld, 2023

Videography
 Lynn Miles: Live at the Chapel, (DVD) 2007

See also

Music of Canada
List of Canadian musicians

References

External links
Lynn Miles official site

1958 births
Living people
Anglophone Quebec people
Canadian folk guitarists
Canadian Folk Music Award winners
Canadian folk singer-songwriters
Canadian women folk guitarists
Canadian women singer-songwriters
Fast Folk artists
Juno Award for Roots & Traditional Album of the Year – Solo winners
Musicians from Quebec
People from Cowansville
Red House Records artists
True North Records artists